Daniel De Leon (born November 6, 2000) is an American soccer player who currently plays as a defender.

Career

Youth
De Leon played high school soccer at Chaska High School, serving as captain for two years and was twice voted All Midwest Region Team. He also played club soccer for CC United, Eden Prairie Soccer Club, and Prior Lake Premier Soccer Club. De Leon committed to playing college soccer at Loyola University Chicago.

Professional 
Instead of playing college soccer, De Leon instead signed a one-year professional contract with Liga FPD side San Carlos, playing with the team's U20 side. He returned to the US during the COVID-19 pandemic, and after his contract with San Carlos expired, he began playing in the United Premier Soccer League with Vlora FC.

On March 9, 2022, De Leon signed with USL Championship club New York Red Bulls II. He made his professional debut on April 2, 2022, starting in a 3–2 loss to FC Tulsa.

References

External links

2000 births
Living people
A.D. San Carlos footballers
American soccer players
Association football defenders
Expatriate footballers in Costa Rica
New York Red Bulls II players
People from Chaska, Minnesota
Soccer players from Minnesota
United Premier Soccer League players
USL Championship players